Athe Mazha Athe Veyil is a 2011 Malayalam drama film directed by G. Manu and starring Anoop Menon and Lena in the lead roles.

Cast
 Anoop Menon as Raghuraman
 Lena as Sreelakshmi
 Jagathy Sreekumar
 Madhupal
 Master Ashwin as Sreekuttan

Release and reception
The film got a limited release in North Kerala on 9 December 2011 and is expecting a wider release later.

Awards
This movie won 4 Kerala critics awards for year 2012.

References

2010s Malayalam-language films
2011 drama films
2011 films
Indian drama films